Perserajuk is a 603 m high mountain in central Greenland.

References 

Mountains of Greenland
Mountains under 1000 metres